Louise Weaver (born 1966) is a contemporary Australian artist working in an array of media including sculptural installations, paintings, drawings, printmaking, collage, textiles, movement and sound. She is best known for her installation and sculptures of animals. Weaver's works have been exhibited in Australia and New Zealand and are featured in major collections both nationally and internationally.

Biography 
Weaver was born in 1966 in Mansfield, Victoria, Australia.

She completed a Bachelor of Arts in 1988 at Royal Melbourne Institute of Technology, and a Masters of Arts, Painting in 1996 at Royal Melbourne Institute of Technology.

She is best known for her large-scale installations featuring sculptures of animals. Since 2014, Weaver has concentrated on creating works that she says are, “loosely termed” paintings using a wide range of materials and matter. Weaver's works have been exhibited in Australia and New Zealand. 

She won the Cicely and Colin Rigg Contemporary Design Award in 2003 for textiles.

A retrospective of Weaver's work was shown at Buxton Contemporary in 2019.

Selected exhibitions 

2003: Moonlight Becomes You, City Gallery Wellington, New Zealand and Dunedin Public Art Gallery, Dunedin, New Zealand
2006: Taking a chance on love – Selected works 1990–2006, McClelland Sculpture Park and Gallery, Victoria, Australia
2019: Between Appearances: The Art of Louise Weaver, curated by Melissa Keys, Buxton Contemporary, University of Melbourne, Melbourne, Australia

Collections 

The British Museum, London, United Kingdom
Art Gallery of New South Wales, Sydney, Australia
Queensland Art Gallery | Gallery of Modern Art, Brisbane, Australia
National Gallery of Victoria, Melbourne, Australia: 1 work (as of March 2020): Sparkling dew-covered branch)
Museum of Contemporary Art Australia, Sydney, Australia: 1 work (as of March 2020): It would seem that eyes can live without hearts (Oracle Fox), 2005
National Gallery of Australia, Canberra, Australia: 3 prints and 3 sculptures (as of March 2020)
Monash University Collection, Melbourne, Australia
Art Gallery of South Australia, Adelaide, Australia
Chartwell Collection, Auckland Art Gallery, New Zealand
Bendigo Art Gallery, Victoria, Australia
Artbank, Sydney & Melbourne, Australia
Malaysian Institute of Management, Kuala Lumpur, Malaysia
Dubbo Regional Art Gallery, Australia
Wollongong University Collection, Australia
The Michael Buxton Contemporary Australian Art Collection, Melbourne, Australia
City of Stonnington Art Collection, Melbourne, Australia
Queensland University of Technology Art Museum, Brisbane, Australia
Faculty of Science Collection, Monash University, Melbourne, Australia

References 

1966 births
Living people
Australian installation artists
Women installation artists
Artists from Victoria (Australia)
21st-century Australian women artists
21st-century Australian artists